Michael Mertens (born 27 December 1965 in Stelle, Lower Saxony) is a retired German shot putter.

He represented the sports clubs VfL Wolfsburg and LG Göttingen, and won silver medals at the German championships in 1997 and 2000.

His personal best throw was 20.24 metres, achieved in June 1998 in Iffezheim.

Achievements

References

1965 births
Living people
People from Harburg (district)
German male shot putters
Athletes (track and field) at the 1996 Summer Olympics
Athletes (track and field) at the 2000 Summer Olympics
Olympic athletes of Germany
Sportspeople from Lower Saxony